Good Trouble may refer to:

Good Trouble, 1982 album by American rock band REO Speedwagon
Good Trouble (TV series), 2019 American drama on Freeform
John Lewis: Good Trouble, 2020 American biographical documentary film